Yenching can refer to:

 Beijing ("Yenching" is an older, alternative name of the city)
 Yenching Academy
Yenching Scholars
Yenching Program
 Harvard–Yenching Institute
 CCC Yenching College
 Yenching University